John Goossens (born 25 July 1988) is a Dutch former professional footballer who mainly played as a defensive midfielder, although he was capable of playing in several positions in midfield, and even as a left winger. Since his retirement from football in 2022, he has worked as a financial counsellor for professional footballers.

He began his career with NEC in the Eredivisie in 2009, after arriving from the famed Ajax academy, before moving to Feyenoord in 2012, where he played for two seasons. After leaving the club in 2014, he spent four years abroad with Indian club Pune City, Romanian club Voluntari and Major League Soccer's Chicago Fire. He returned to the Netherlands in 2018, ending his career with ADO Den Haag.

At international level, Goossens has also represented the Netherlands at U17 and U21 levels, scoring two goals at the 2005 FIFA U-17 World Championship with the former and finishing in third place at the tournament.

Club career
Born in Heemstede, Goossens began his career at HBC Heemstede, then joined Ajax in September 1999, and was promoted to Jong Ajax in November 2006 and signed a new contract later in May 2007, that will keep him until 2011. In the 2008–09 season, he played left back in that team, where he had previously acted as left winger. However, under the management of Marco van Basten, Goossens was told that he doesn't have a future at Ajax no longer. While at Ajax, Goossens was described as "super talented".

NEC
On 2 February 2009, Goossens moved from Ajax to NEC, where he signed a contract for four years. Previously moving to NEC, FC Twente originally keen to sign Goosens. Both parties already agreed with Goossens, but could with Ajax not agree on the terms of the contract. Ajax wanted the contract to include a repurchase option, to which Twente ceased negotiations. Goossens signed a contract until mid- 2012 in Nijmegen.

He made his professional football debut on 4 February 2009, playing his first game against Groningen, where he came on as a substitute for Rachid Bouaouzan in the 29th minute. Goossens then scored his first goal for the club, in a 1–1 draw against Twente on 3 April 2009. In his first half to his career at NEC, Goossens made eight appearances and scoring once.

In the 2009–10 season, Goossens started his full season at NEC when he wasn't used and was on the bench at the start of the season before he scored his first goal of the season, in a 1–1 draw against ADO Den Haag. A week later, on 28 October 2009, in the third round of KNVB Cup, in a 2–1 win over Excelsior. Then, he scored his second league goal of the season, in a 4–3 loss against Twente two months later. Then in the fourth round of KNVB Cup, Goossens then scored, in a 2–0 win over Groningen. During a friendly match against Pelister, Goossens damaged his left ankle that left him out between four and six weeks. He made his return, in a 2–0 loss to Groningen on 20 February 2010. Goossens then scored his third goal of the season, in a 4–1 loss to Heerenveen on 20 March 2010. At the end of the season, Goosses scored five goals in twenty-four appearances in all competitions. One of his goal this season resulted Goossens being awarded for Goal of the season.

In the 2010–11 season, Goossens started his season when he scored his goal of the season, when he scored in a 3–1 loss against PSV on 11 September 2010. Despite being on the losing side, Goossens was named by Algemeen Dagblad as the team of the week. Then, in the third round of KNVB Cup against Dordrecht, Goossens was sent-off after a straight red card in the 45th minute, which NEC lost 4–3. After the match, Goossens was given a three match ban, which lead the club appealed. As a result, Goossens was suspended on one match. The appeal would later become successful. He then scored his second goal of the season, in a 3–1 win over Willem II on 11 December 2010, followed up his third goal on 22 January 2011, in a 2–2 draw against NAC Breda. He then scored his fourth and fifth goal against Utrecht and Vitesse Arnhem. The next game after Vitesse, Goossens scored twice, in a 4–1 win over VVV-Venlo. At the end of the 2010–11 season, Goossens scored seven goals in thirteen appearances. The club started negotiation a new contract for Goossens, whose contract expire at the end of the 2011–12 season.

In 2011–12 season, Goossens appeared in two matches before being sidelined with a knee injury which he sustained during a match. Goossens made his return, in a 3–0 loss against Ajax, where he made a start, only to be substituted for 25 minutes after injuring his ankle. Goossens would score twice from a direct free kick, in a 2–0 win over VVV-Venlo. After the match, Goossens never practice taking free kick. Goossens then scored four days later, in the fourth round of KNVB Cup, in a 3–0 win over Achilles '29 (III). His third goal of the season came in a 4–0 win over Groningen on 25 February 2012. Soon after, Goossens ended his season and his career at NEC when he had a knee surgery and kept him for eight weeks.

Due to his good performance for NEC Nijmegen, Goossens was offered a new contract in 2012, but he rejected the offer. Welsh side Swansea City were interested in signing Goossens. This led to the club's technical director Carlos Aalbers admitted he had mixed feelings over midfielder John Goossens' proposed move to the club. NEC stated they do not want to risk losing Goossens on a free transfer in the summer. Eventually, Goossens eventually rejected a move to Swansea as he had decided to serve the remainder of his contract.

Feyenoord
Two weeks later, Feyenoord managed to sign him on a free transfer at the end of the season. Eventually, Goossens agreed to join Feyenoord on a four-year deal. The club's technical director Martin van Geel said: "We are delighted that Goossens has chosen Feyenoord." On 25 June 2012, Goossens was fit when he appeared at the club's first training sessions of the season. Goossens made his Feyenoord debut when they played in a friendly match against FC Horst on 10 July 2012, which he played for an hour. However, Goossen's career at Feyenoord career didn't a good start after he wasn't fit, with recurring injury around him.

After three months at the club, Goossens made his debut for the club on 21 October 2012, where he set up the second goal in the match for Feyenoord, in a 3–2 win over VVV-Venlo. However, for the second time this season, Goossens was out for a month with a knee injury. Following his return, Goossens scored his first goals for Feyernood, in a 6–0 win over Heracles, as well as, making two assists, on 28 April 2013. Goossens would make 10 appearances and scoring two goals in his first season.

In the 2013–14 season, Goossens started his season well when he scored his first goal of the season, in a 4–0 win over Roda JC on 1 September 2013. Goossens continued to be a first team regular, though he had problem with indifferent form and his playing minutes significantly decreased. Towards the end of the season, Goossen sustained a hamstring injury during training that left him out for four weeks. Goossens made his return in the last game of the season, in a 1–1 draw against AZ Alkmaar, where he came on as a substitute in the second half. At the end of the season, Goossens would make twenty appearances for the club. However, the start of the 2014–15 season, it was announced that Goossens left the club by mutual consent.

Pune City
Goossens signed for Pune City in October 2014.

Goossens suffered a very serious lower rib cage and paraspinal muscle injury after a collision with his own goalkeeper Arindam Bhattacharya on 7 November 2014, which ruled him out for the remainder of the season.

Voluntari
In September 2015, Goossens signed for Romanian side FC Voluntari.

Chicago Fire
Following a successful trial, Goossens signed for Major League Soccer side Chicago Fire on 29 February 2016.

ADO Den Haag
On 9 March 2018, Goossens signed a contract with ADO Den Haag until 2019. The club hesitated registrating Goossens to wait for the outcome of physical tests, and as the paperwork was not completed in time, Goossens was not eligible to play for ADO for the rest of the season. He made his competitive debut on 12 August in a 2–1 home loss to FC Emmen, coming on as a substitute for Aaron Meijers in the 75th minute. He scored his first goal for the club in the return game against Emmen on 10 February 2019, which ended in a 3–2 away loss.

Goossens left ADO Den Haag on 2 January 2022 by mutual consent. He scored five goals in 73 official matches for the club. After leaving the club, he practiced with fellow Eerste Divisie club Telstar. He retired from football shortly after and instead started his own business, Fuse Sports, which provides financial guidance for professional footballers.

International career
Goossens was part of the Netherlands U-17 squad that reached third place at the 2005 FIFA U-17 World Championship. He scored two goals in the tournament.

Career statistics

References

External links
 FIFA Profile
 Voetbal International profile 
 KNVB Profile
 Netherlands stats at Ons Oranje

1988 births
Living people
People from Heemstede
Association football midfielders
Dutch footballers
Netherlands under-21 international footballers
Netherlands youth international footballers
NEC Nijmegen players
AFC Ajax players
Feyenoord players
FC Pune City players
FC Voluntari players
Chicago Fire FC players
ADO Den Haag players
Eredivisie players
Indian Super League players
Liga I players
Major League Soccer players
Eerste Divisie players
Dutch expatriate sportspeople in the United States
Footballers from North Holland
Expatriate soccer players in the United States
Dutch expatriate footballers
Dutch expatriate sportspeople in India
Expatriate footballers in India
Dutch expatriate sportspeople in Romania
Expatriate footballers in Romania